Nosferatu is a graphic novel based on the 1922 silent film of the same name, modernized by Christopher Howard Wolf and Justin Wayne, and published by Viper Comics. Among the changes made to modernize the story is the revelation that female protagonists Tommy and Elle are in a same-sex relationship.

Synopsis

Tommy Hutter is a female photographer from the United States who goes to Germany to photograph an ancient, secluded castle. While there, she meets Count Orlok, secretly the Nosferatu, who lives in the ruined building. Orlok becomes infatuated by a picture of Tommy's girlfriend, Elle, which is on her laptop computer. Upon leaving Germany, Tommy comes to discover that Orlok has traveled to the United States as well, and she must try to save Elle from his clutches.

Controversy

Before and after the release of the Nosferatu graphic novel, multiple sites discussed the decision to feature a same-sex couple as the protagonists. While the change was questioned before release, later reviews proved to favor it as a believably depicted relationship.

In an interview, the author stated that while the characters were conceived of as lesbians, there was no initial agenda behind the decision. However, he also noted that the change lent a new level of horror to the unwanted advances of Count Orlok.

External links
Nosferatu Homepage
Nosferatu. Viper Comics

References

Nosferatu
Viper Comics titles